Syed Raza Ali Gillani is a Pakistani politician who had been a Member of the Provincial Assembly of the Punjab, from 2002 to May 2018.

Early life and education
He was born on 30 April 1975 in Lahore.

He received his early education from Aitchison College. He graduated in 1995 from Government College, Lahore and received a degree  of Master of Science  in Textile Marketing from Philadelphia University in 1999.

Political career

He ran for the seat of the Provincial Assembly of the Punjab as a candidate of Pakistan Muslim League (Q) (PML-Q) from Constituency PP-188 (Okara-IV) in 2002 Pakistani general election but was unsuccessful. He received 27,280 votes and lost the seat to Chaudry Iftikhar Hussain Chachar. In the same election, he was elected to the Provincial Assembly of the Punjab as a candidate of PML-Q from Constituency PP-187 (Okara-III). He received 35,797 votes and defeated a candidate of Pakistan Muslim League (Jinnah). In January 2003, he was inducted into the provincial Punjab cabinet of Chief Minister Chaudhry Pervaiz Elahi and was appointed Minister of Punjab for Housing and Urban Development. During his tenure as member of the Provincial Assembly of the Punjab, he also served as Provincial Minister of Punjab for Public Health Engineering.

He was re-elected to the Provincial Assembly of the Punjab  as a candidate of PML-Q from Constituency PP-187 (Okara-III) in 2008 Pakistani general election. He received 30,233 votes and defeated Manzoor Wattoo.

He was re-elected to the Provincial Assembly of the Punjab as a candidate of Pakistan Muslim League (N) from Constituency PP-187 (Okara-III) in 2013 Pakistani general election. In November 2016, he was inducted into the provincial Punjab cabinet of Chief Minister Shehbaz Sharif and was made Provincial Minister of Punjab for Higher Education.

References 

Living people
Punjab MPAs 2013–2018
1975 births
Pakistan Muslim League (N) politicians
Punjab MPAs 2002–2007
Punjab MPAs 2008–2013